Posege (meaning: "greeness"; alternate Pose-uingge, meaning "Pose village-at") is one of the principal Tewa Pueblo ancestral sites in New Mexico, US. Located on the banks of the Rio Ojo Caliente at the site of Ojo Caliente, there were 13 kivas, and a population of approximately 2,000.

References

Pueblo great houses
Archaeological sites in New Mexico
Puebloan buildings and structures
Native American history of New Mexico
Ruins in the United States
Former populated places in New Mexico
Tewa
Pueblos in New Mexico